Dav Pech is a 1989  Hindi-language action film, produced by Padmini under the Padmini Films Pvt. Ltd. banner, directed by Kawal Sharma. It stars Jeetendra, Bhanupriya  and music composed by Anu Malik. The film is remake of the Telugu movie Roshagadu (1983), starring Chiranjeevi, Madhavi in the pivotal roles.

Plot
K. K. (Prem Chopra) and Durjan (Shakti Kapoor) were smugglers. Sikander (Jeetendra) snatched the smuggled goods from both and distributed the money to the poor. Bajrangi (again Jeetendra), a village boy lived with his sister whose marriage had broken because of poverty. Bajrangi came to Mumbai with his sister to earn money. Sikander died in an accident. After the death of Sikander, Sunita and others recognized Bajrangi as Sikander. But Bajrangi told Sunita the truth. Sunita trained Bajrangi in becoming Sikander. Bajrangi killed most of the people of K. K. and Durjan. Ultimately K. K. and Durjan plotted to kill Sikander (actually, Bajrangi). Bajrangi, with the help of the police attacked both of them and finally arrested K. K. and Durjan. Bajrangi married Sunita and lived happily ever after.

Cast
Jeetendra as Bajrangi / Sikander (Dual Role)
Bhanupriya as Inspector Sunita Verma 
Prem Chopra as K. K.
Shakti Kapoor as Durjan 
Chandrashekhar as Police Commissioner
C. S. Dubey as Molester   
Bob Christo as Gambler
Manik Irani as Sampat

Soundtrack

References

External links

1989 films
1980s Hindi-language films
Films scored by Anu Malik
Hindi remakes of Telugu films
Indian action films
1989 action films
Hindi-language action films